A quality management system (QMS) is a collection of business processes focused on consistently meeting customer requirements and enhancing their satisfaction. It is aligned with an organization's purpose and strategic direction (ISO 9001:2015). It is expressed as the organizational goals and aspirations, policies, processes, documented information, and resources needed to implement and maintain it. Early quality management systems emphasized predictable outcomes of an industrial product production line, using simple statistics and random sampling.  By the 20th century, labor inputs were typically the most costly inputs in most industrialized societies, so focus shifted to team cooperation and dynamics, especially the early signaling of problems via a continual improvement cycle.  In the 21st century, QMS has tended to converge with sustainability and transparency initiatives, as both investor and customer satisfaction and perceived quality are increasingly tied to these factors.  Of QMS regimes, the ISO 9000 family of standards is probably the most widely implemented worldwide – the ISO 19011 audit regime applies to both and deals with quality and sustainability and their integration.

Other QMS, e.g. Natural Step, focus on sustainability issues and assume that other quality problems will be reduced as result of the systematic thinking, transparency, documentation and diagnostic discipline.

The term "Quality Management System" and the initialism "QMS" were invented in 1991 by Ken Croucher, a British management consultant working on designing and implementing a generic model of a QMS within the IT industry.

Elements
 Quality objectives
 Quality manual
 Organizational structure and responsibilities
 Data management
 Processes – including purchasing
 Product quality leading to customer satisfaction
 Continuous improvement including corrective and preventive action
   Quality instrument
 Document control
 Employee training and engagement
 Supplier quality management

Concept of quality – historical background
The concept of a quality as we think of it now first emerged from the Industrial Revolution. Previously goods had been made from start to finish by the same person or team of people, with handcrafting and tweaking the product to meet 'quality criteria'. Mass production brought huge teams of people together to work on specific stages of production where one person would not necessarily complete a product from start to finish. In the late 19th century pioneers such as Frederick Winslow Taylor and Henry Ford recognized the limitations of the methods being used in mass production at the time and the subsequent varying quality of output. Birland established Quality Departments to oversee the quality of production and rectifying of errors, and Ford emphasized standardization of design and component standards to ensure a standard product was produced. Management of quality was the responsibility of the Quality department and was implemented by Inspection of product output to 'catch' defects.

Application of statistical control came later as a result of World War production methods, which were advanced by the work done of W. Edwards Deming, a statistician, after whom the Deming Prize for quality is named.  Joseph M. Juran focused more on managing for quality.   The first edition of Juran's Quality Control Handbook was published in 1951.  He also developed the "Juran's trilogy", an approach to cross-functional management that is composed of three managerial processes: quality planning, quality control, and quality improvement. These functions all play a vital role when evaluating quality.

Quality, as a profession and the managerial process associated with the quality function, was introduced during the second half of the 20th century and has evolved since then. Over this period, few other disciplines have seen as many changes as the quality profession.

The quality profession grew from simple control to engineering, to systems engineering. Quality control activities were predominant in the 1940s, 1950s, and 1960s. The 1970s were an era of quality engineering and the 1990s saw quality systems as an emerging field. Like medicine, accounting, and engineering, quality has achieved status as a recognized profession

As Lee and Dale (1998) state, there are many organizations that are striving to assess the methods and ways in which their overall productivity, the quality of their products and services and the required operations to achieve them are done.

Medical devices
The two primary, state of the art, guidelines for medical device manufacturer QMS and related services today are the ISO 13485 standards and the US FDA 21 CFR 820 regulations. The two have a great deal of similarity, and many manufacturers adopt QMS that is compliant with both guidelines.

ISO 13485 are harmonized with the European Union Regulation 2017/745 as well as the IVD and AIMD directives. The ISO standard is also incorporated in regulations for other jurisdictions such as Japan (JPAL) and Canada (CMDCAS).

Quality System requirements for medical devices have been internationally recognized as a way to assure product safety and efficacy and customer satisfaction since at least 1983 and were instituted as requirements in a  final rule published on October 7, 1996. The U.S. Food and Drug Administration (FDA) had documented design defects in medical devices that contributed to recalls from 1983 to 1989 that would have been prevented if Quality Systems had been in place. The rule is promulgated at 21 CFR 820.

According to current Good Manufacturing Practice (GMP), medical device manufacturers have the responsibility to use good judgment when developing their quality system and apply those sections of the FDA Quality System (QS) Regulation that are applicable to their specific products and operations, in Part 820 of the QS regulation. As with GMP, operating within this flexibility, it is the responsibility of each manufacturer to establish requirements for each type or family of devices that will result in devices that are safe and effective, and to establish methods and procedures to design, produce, and distribute devices that meet the quality system requirements.

The FDA has identified in the QS regulation the 7 essential subsystems of a quality system. These subsystems include:

 Management controls;
 Design controls;
 Production and process controls
 Corrective and preventative actions
 Material controls
 Records, documents, and change controls
 Facilities and equipment controls
all overseen by management and quality audits.

Because the QS regulation covers a broad spectrum of devices and production processes, it allows some leeway in the details of quality system elements. It is left to manufacturers to determine the necessity for, or extent of, some quality elements and to develop and implement procedures tailored to their particular processes and devices. For example, if it is impossible to mix up labels at a manufacturer because there is only one label to each product, then there is no necessity for the manufacturer to comply with all of the GMP requirements under device labeling.

Drug manufacturers are regulated under a different section of the Code of Federal Regulations:

Organizations and awards

The  International Organization for Standardization's ISO 9001:2015 series describes standards for a QMS addressing the principles and processes surrounding the design, development, and delivery of a general product or service. Organizations can participate in a continuing certification process to ISO 9001:2015 to demonstrate their compliance with the standard, which includes a requirement for continual (i.e. planned) improvement of the QMS, as well as more foundational QMS components such as failure mode and effects analysis (FMEA).

ISO 9000:2005 provides information on the fundamentals and vocabulary used in quality management systems.  ISO 9004:2009 provides guidance on a quality management approach for the sustained success of an organization.  Neither of these standards can be used for certification purposes as they provide guidance, not requirements.

The Baldrige Performance Excellence Program educates organizations in improving their performance and administers the Malcolm Baldrige National Quality Award. The Baldrige Award recognizes U.S. organizations for performance excellence based on the Baldrige Criteria for Performance Excellence. The Criteria address critical aspects of management that contribute to performance excellence: leadership; strategy; customers; measurement, analysis, and knowledge management; workforce; operations; and results.

The European Foundation for Quality Management's EFQM Excellence Model supports an award scheme similar to the Baldrige Award for European companies.

In Canada, the National Quality Institute presents the 'Canada Awards for Excellence' on an annual basis to organizations that have displayed outstanding performance in the areas of Quality and Workplace Wellness, and have met the institute's criteria with documented overall achievements and results.

The European Quality in Social Service (EQUASS) is a sector-specific quality system designed for the social services sector and addresses quality principles that are specific to service delivery to vulnerable groups, such as empowerment, rights, and person-centredness.

The Alliance for Performance Excellence is a network of state and local organizations that use the Baldrige Criteria for Performance Excellence at the grassroots level to improve the performance of local organizations and economies. browsers can find Alliance members in their state and get the latest news and events from the Baldrige community.

Process
A QMS process is an element of an organizational QMS. The ISO 9001 standard requires organizations seeking compliance or certification to define the processes which form the QMS and the sequence and interaction of these processes. Butterworth-Heinemann and other publishers have offered several books which provide step-by-step guides to those seeking the quality certifications of their products, 

Examples of such processes include:

 order processes,
 production plans,
 product/ service/ process measurements to comply with specific requirements e.g. statistical process control and measurement systems analysis,
 calibrations,
 internal audit,
 corrective and preventive action,
 identification, labeling and control of non-conforming products to prevent its inadvertent use, delivery or processing,
 purchasing and related processes such as supplier selection and monitoring

ISO 9001 requires that the performance of these processes be measured, analyzed and continually improved, and the results of this form an input into the management review process.

Software 
Quality management software offers the techniques, processes, structure, and resources needed to simplify manufacturing and ERP activities while handling quality concerns efficiently and cost-effectively.

Helps manufacturers to monitor, control, and document quality processes electronically to guarantee that goods are made within tolerance, meet all necessary requirements, and are defect-free. Quality management software is often used in the manufacturing industry to identify potential issues before they occur.

Some benefits of quality management software include:

 real-time data monitoring
 issue prevention
 risk management
 increased efficiency and productivity
 process consistency
 increased employee participation

Quality management software can be integrated with manufacturing execution systems (MES). A MES is a complete, dynamic software system for monitoring, tracking, documenting, and controlling the manufacturing process from raw materials to final products. When combined with QMS, these systems:

 ensure compliance
 enable quality programs
 eliminate waste
 less product recalls
 lower per-product cost
 higher product quality
 real-time information for increase in quality control
 realistic production schedules
 up-to-date inventory
 product tracking

Quality management software focuses on 4 main elements:

 Document management: Quality management software enables companies to manage all product and quality records and documents, including product specifications, work instructions, standard operating procedures (SOPs), quality policies, and training records, among other things, to fulfill highly regulated requirements. Quality management software centralizes the storage of these documents. 
 Regulatory compliance: To decrease compliance risks, quality management software is used within companies to make sure they comply with ISO, OSHA, FDA, and other industry norms and requirements. The software makes closed-loop corrective and preventive action procedures (CAPA) possible, which result in faster issue resolution and issue prevention.
 Feedback loops: Quality management software permits staff to submit feedback or recommendations through centralized software. In turn, this way, managers gather insights from the shop floor creating a feedback loop.
 Training and skill management: To maintain product quality, quality management software can provide a fixed system through which employees and staff can be trained. This fixed system provides more clarity in the different tracking processes of the company and simplifies the tracking of different skill levels of employees.

Most quality management software are cloud-based and offer software as a service.

See also
Capability Maturity Model Integration
Cleaner production
Good manufacturing practice
ISO 14001
List of management topics
List of national quality awards
Manufacturing process management
Positive recall
Process architecture
Quality
Quality assurance
Quality control
Quality management
Software quality
Standard operating procedure
Technical documentation
Total quality management
Verification and validation

References

General references
ICH1 Guidance E6: Good Clinical Practice: Consolidated guideline (and see Clinical Quality Management System)
 Pyzdek, T, "Quality Engineering Handbook", 2003, 
 Juran, Joseph M. and De Feo, Joseph A., "Juran's Quality Handbook", 6th Edition, 1999, 
 Beernaerts, Indira (2022-02-16). "The key requirements of a good QMS system for manufacturing". Azumuta. Retrieved 2022-03-24.
 "Quality Management Systems". Siemens.com. Retrieved 23 March 2022.
 "What Is en MES (Manufacturing Execution System)?". SAP.com. 23 March 2022. Retrieved 23 March 2022.

External links
 WHAT IS A QUALITY MANAGEMENT SYSTEM (QMS)?

Quality management